William Towerson (died c. 1630) was an English merchant and politician who sat in the House of Commons at various times between 1621 and 1629.

Towerson was a member of the Worshipful Company of Skinners. He was the first Deputy-Governor of the Irish Society from 1610 to 1613. He was on the Committee of the East India Company from 1619 to 1622, until retiring after the execution of his brother Gabriel in the Amboyna massacre.

In 1621, he was elected Member of Parliament for City of London. He was elected MP for Portsmouth in 1628 and sat until 1628 when King Charles decided to rule without parliament for eleven years.

Towerson died between 7 May 1630 when he made his will and 16 January 1631 when it was proved.

References

 

Year of birth missing
1630s deaths
17th-century merchants
English MPs 1628–1629
Members of the Parliament of England for the City of London
English MPs 1621–1622
Directors of the British East India Company